Dhanbari is a town of Dhanbari Upazila, Tangail, Bangladesh. The town is situated 63 km northeast of Tangail city and 143 km northwest of Dhaka city, the capital of Bangladesh.

l.

Education
The literacy rate of Dhanbari town is 70% (Male-53.8%, Female-50.8%).

References
 

Populated places in Dhaka Division
Populated places in Tangail District
Pourashavas of Bangladesh